Robert Jon & the Wreck is an American four-piece blues rock and Southern rock band. Formed in Orange County, California, United States, in 2011, the ensemble has released several albums and toured extensively.  Their most recent studio album, Shine a Light on Me Brother (2021), was described by one reviewer as their "best album to date which is saying a lot. It's a great album from start to finish".

Career
The quintet began their journey in February 2011 in Orange County, California, United States. Within six months of their formation, Robert Jon & the Wreck had undertaken a national tour playing 60 shows and self-released their debut album, Fire Started. In 2013, the band released an EP, Rhythm of the Road, which was produced by Warren Huart and had been recorded at the Swing House Studios in Hollywood, Los Angeles. Robert Jon & the Wreck were named 'Best Live Band' at the 2013 Orange County Music Awards. In mid 2014, in between touring commitments, the band recorded a second EP, The RedBull Sessions, at RedBull Studios in Santa Monica, California. Less than six months later, Robert Jon & the Wreck recorded again, this time at the Sunset Sound Studios in Hollywood, with record producer Warren Huart once more in attendance. They amassed a ten track collection, Glory Bound, which was released on February 24, 2015. 

In 2016, Huart helmed their next album, Good Life Pie, with the recording taking place at Hybrid Studios in Santa Ana, California. Good Life Pie was issued on May 13, 2016. By this stage the band were touring both the United States and parts of Europe on a regular basis, returning periodically to California to record.  In 2017, they recorded Robert Jon & The Wreck, and reissued their earlier EPs into a compilation album, Wreckage: Vol.1.  In addition that year, line-up changes took place with Henry James (Schneekluth) and Warren Murel both joining the band.  The ensuing European trip included their appearance at the Moulin Blues Fest in Ospel, Netherlands. Their self-titled album was finally released in May 2018.

In May 2019, the band issued their next studio album, Take Me Higher, which had been conceived and written with the new members, Henry James and Warren Murrel. Their subsequent touring schedule took in the Ramblin' Man Fair in the UK alongside headliners Foreigner, and the Keeping The Blues Alive at Sea Mediterranean Blues Cruise in the company of Joe Bonamassa, Peter Frampton, Eric Gales, and Robert Randolph and the Family Band. Their next album, Last Light on the Highway, was released on May 8, 2020. The album featured backing singers Mahalia Barnes, Jade MacRae and Juanita Tippins. "Tired Of Drinking Alone" was one of 11 self-penned tracks making up the collection. The release warranted a favorable mention in Rolling Stone, and the single release from the album, "Oh Miss Carolina", had a three month tenure on Planet Rock Radio in the UK. By this stage the band membership had settled as Robert Jon Burrison (lead vocals/guitar), Andrew Espantman (drums/background vocals), Steve Maggiora (keyboards/background vocals), Henry James (lead guitar), and Warren Murrel (bass guitar). Their next studio album was Shine a Light on Me Brother, which was released on September 3, 2021. It received critical acclaim. One reviewer commented "Shine A Light On Me Brother is Robert Jon and the Wreck's best album to date which is saying a lot. It's a great album from start to finish". Touring commitments throughout 2021 took in parts of Europe, including at Bospop in Weert, Netherlands, the UK in May, plus Australian and Japanese dates. Wreckage Vol. 2 (2022), was a compilation album covering in-studio and live performances recorded between 2020 and 2022. On November 4, 2022, the band announced via Instagram that Maggiora had left the band, due to his duties as a member of the Toto touring band.

The band has finished a major US touring schedule and is due to tour the UK in 2023.

Band members
Robert Jon Burrison – Lead vocals, guitar
Warren Murrel – Bass guitar
Henry James (Schneekluth) – Lead guitar, vocals
Andrew Espantman – Drums, backing vocals
Formerly
David Pelusi – Bass guitar, vocals
Kristopher Butcher – Lead guitar, vocals
Kyle Michael Neal – Lead guitar, backing vocals
Steve Maggiora – Keyboards, vocals
Nick Phakpiseth – Bass guitar

Discography

Albums

References

External links
Official website

American blues musical groups
Musical groups established in 2011
Musical groups from California
2011 establishments in California
Contemporary blues musicians
Blues rock musicians
People from Orange County, California